An Ordinary Miracle may refer to:
 An Ordinary Miracle (1964 film), a Soviet 1964 romantic fantasy film
 An Ordinary Miracle (1978 film), a Soviet 1978 romantic fantasy musical film
 "Ordinary Miracle", a song by Dave Stewart and Glen Ballard, performed by Sarah McLachlan, from the 2006 film Charlotte's Web